La Marche de l’empereur is the original soundtrack to the film March of the Penguins (for the original French version). This critically acclaimed soundtrack was composed and performed by Émilie Simon. The album was nominated for Best Original Score in the 2006 César Awards, and won Best Original Soundtrack in the 2006 Victoires de la musique.

The soundtrack was replaced by a score by Alex Wurman for the English version of  the film to fit its documentary approach.

Track listing

Charts

Album

Émilie Simon albums
2005 soundtrack albums
Documentary film soundtracks
Barclay (record label) soundtracks